"God's Own Country" is a phrase meaning an area, region or place supposedly favoured by God.

Examples

Australia 
In Australia, the phrase "God's own country" was often used to describe the country in the early 1900s, but it appears to have gradually fallen out of favour. The phrase "God's Country" is often used to describe Queensland and the Sutherland Shire in southern Sydney.

Brazil 
The idea of "God's own country", worded as "Deus é brasileiro" (Portuguese: "God is Brazilian"), is a common trope in Brazilian culture to inspire optimism and point out the country has vast resources but faces few natural disasters nor international conflict. It is referenced by politicians and artworks, as in the movie God Is Brazilian.

England 
When used in reference to England, "God's own country" refers to the legend that as a boy Jesus visited England with his great uncle, Joseph of Arimathea. The event itself inspired the musical prelude to William Blake's Milton, the piece "And did those feet in ancient time", also known as "Jerusalem", which has become an unofficial anthem of England. The poem asks if Jesus did visit England in ancient times, and in so doing create the New Jerusalem, or heaven in England.

Another first usage of the term by Edward du Bois was in a poem describing the English county of Surrey in 1839. The phrase was also used in its more literal meaning to refer to Heaven, in a poem by Elizabeth Harcourt Rolls Mitchell in 1857.

Yorkshire 
The phrase has been used to describe Yorkshire, England's largest county. The term "God's Own County" has also been used.

India

Kerala

Kerala Tourism
“God’s Own Country’ is the tagline of Kerala Tourism which was coined by Walter Mendez, the Creative Director of an Indian advertising agency in 1989 at the request of the Tourism Department, Government of Kerala.

This was used by agencies to showcase Kerala’s natural beauty and not-so-explored places across the state.  

Kerala Tourism has won several awards for its innovative tourism campaign. Each of them depicted God’s Own Country in a new light, ensuring that the tagline continues to be associated with Kerala.

Mythology
According to the 17th century Malayalam work Keralolpathi, the lands of Kerala were recovered from the sea by the axe-wielding warrior sage Parasurama, the sixth avatar of God Vishnu (hence, Kerala is also called Parasurama Kshetram; 'The Land of Parasurama').

According to the legend, Parasurama threw his axe across the sea, and the water receded as far as it reached. This new area of land extended from Gokarna to Kanyakumari. The land which rose from sea was filled with salt and was unsuitable for habitation; so Parasurama invoked the Snake King Vasuki, who spat the holy poison and converted the soil into fertile lush green land. Out of respect, Vasuki and all snakes were appointed as protectors and guardians of the land.

Another much earlier Puranic character associated with Kerala is Mahabali, an Asura and a prototypical just king, who ruled the earth from Kerala. He won the war against the Devas, driving them into exile. The Devas pleaded before Lord Vishnu, who took his fifth incarnation as Vamana and pushed Mahabali down to the netherworld to placate the Devas. Lord Vishnu, seeing the devotion of Mahabali, blessed him to be the Indra of the next Manvantara. There is a belief that, once a year during the Onam festival, Mahabali returns to Kerala. It is said that the god Vishnu is guarding Mahabali's Kingdom as a mark of respect for his virtues.

The Matsya Purana, one of the oldest of the 18 Puranas, uses the Malaya Mountains of Kerala (and Tamil Nadu) as the setting for the story of Matsya, the first incarnation of Vishnu, and Manu, the first man and the king of the region. These Puranic accounts portray Kerala as "God’s own country", or the land favoured by God. The description of Kerala as "God's own country" can additionally be traced to the event known as Thrippadidanam, in which in 1749-50, the then ruler Marthanda Varma, Maharaja of Travancore, decided to "donate" his realm to Sri Padmanabha (Vishnu) and thereafter rule as the deity's "vicegerent" (Sri Padmanabha Dasa). The slogan also alludes to the variety of faiths in the state: Hindus, Muslims, Christians, Buddhists, Jains, Jews, and Parsis (Zoroastrians) have coexisted harmoniously for centuries as the mishmash of temples, towers, spires and synagogues attest.

New Zealand 
The earliest recorded use of the phrase as applied to New Zealand was as the title of a poem about New Zealand written by Thomas Bracken. It was published in a book of his poems in 1890, and again in 1893 in a book entitled Lays and Lyrics: God's Own Country and Other Poems. God's Own Country as a phrase was often used and popularised by New Zealand's longest serving prime minister, Richard John Seddon. He last quoted it on 10 June 1906 when he sent a telegram to the Victorian premier, Thomas Bent, the day before leaving Sydney to return home to New Zealand. "Just leaving for God's own country," he wrote. He never made it, dying the next day on the ship Oswestry Grange. Bracken's God's Own Country is less well known internationally than God Defend New Zealand, which he published in 1876. The latter poem, set to music by John Joseph Woods, was declared the country's national hymn in 1940, and made the second national anthem of New Zealand along with God Save the Queen in 1977.

In recent times, the form Godzone on its own has been used informally of New Zealand.

United States 
The phrase later found sporadic use to describe several American regions. Most known is the Upper Peninsula of Michigan. It is currently used to describe South Boston.  It was also used by the Confederate army to describe parts of Tennessee in the 1860s. The phrase was also used to describe California in the 1860s, and by Clement Laird Vallandigham to describe the land of the Mississippi plains. None of these remain widely used to describe a region, though it is still occasionally used to describe the United States overall.

During World War II, German Nazi propaganda minister Joseph Goebbels sarcastically mocked the US as "Aus Gottes eigenem Land" (From God's Own Country) in an essay that appeared in the German newspaper Das Reich on 9 August 1942. Goebbels ridiculed the United States as a young land that lacked culture, education and history in contrast with Germany. In 1943, the Nazis published an anti-American, anti-semitic propaganda book written by Erwin Berghaus called "USA – nackt!: Bilddokumente aus Gottes eigenem Land" ("USA naked! Photo documents from God's own country") which also mockingly characterized the US with the phrase. Several modern German newspapers such as Die Welt, Der Tagesspiegel and Die Zeit, have also used the phrase "Gottes eigenes Land" ("God's own country") to criticize American culture and society.

Zimbabwe
The phrase "God's own country" was heard during the 1970s in Zimbabwe (formerly Rhodesia, Southern Rhodesia), where most people perceived the land as beautiful despite the ongoing Bush War of the time. Evidence of the phrase being used earlier in reference to Rhodesia is found in Chartered Millions: Rhodesia and the Challenge to the British Commonwealth by John Hobbis Harris, published 1920 by Swarthmore Press (refer to page 27). The phrase "Godzone" is distinctly different and was not used in Rhodesia.

References

Alternative place names
Tourism in Kerala
Tourism campaigns